James Palmer Rankin (April 30, 1855 – June 15, 1934) was a physician and political figure in Ontario, Canada. He represented Perth North in the House of Commons of Canada from 1908 to 1911 and from 1921 to 1925 as a Liberal. Rankin then sat for Perth North division in the Senate of Canada from 1925 to 1934.

He was born in East Zorra, Canada West, the son of David Rankin and Jane P. Dennis, and was educated in Cobourg and Hamilton, then at the University of Toronto and University of Edinburgh. Rankin practised as a physician and surgeon in Stratford, Ontario. He married Mary Jane McKee in 1880. He served as a lieutenant-colonel in the Canadian Army Medical Corps during World War I. Rankin was defeated by Hugh Boulton Morphy when he ran for reelection to the House of Commons in 1911 and 1917, then defeated Morphy in the 1921 federal election. He died in office in Stratford at the age of 79.

References

Members of the House of Commons of Canada from Ontario
Conservative Party of Canada (1867–1942) MPs
Canadian senators from Ontario
University of Toronto alumni
1855 births
1934 deaths